Honorius may refer to:

People 
 Honorius (emperor) (Flavius Honorius Augustus, 384–423), western Roman emperor 395–423
 Honorius of Canterbury (Saint Honorius, died 653), archbishop of Canterbury 627–653
 Honoratus of Amiens (Saint Honorius of Amiens), bishop of Amiens 
 Pope Honorius I (died 638), Pope 625–638
 Pope Honorius II (died 1130), Pope 1124–1130
 Pope Honorius III (1150–1227), Pope 1216–1227
 Pope Honorius IV (1210–1287), Pope 1285–1287
 Antipope Honorius II (died 1072), 1061–1064
 Honorius of Thebes, dates unknown
 Honorius Augustodunensis (Honorius of Autun, 1080–1151), Christian theologian, 12th century
 Honorius of Kent, died after 1210, Archdeacon of Richmond and canonist

Other uses 
 Honorius (plant), a genus of plants
 Honorius, a character in the Bartimaeus Trilogy

See also
 Honoré